Tasty 168 is a bubble tea brand.  It operates its own stores under the name Tea Shop 168, as well as producing beverages for other shops under the label Tasty 168. Its stores make it the largest bubble tea chain in Canada. The chain has been criticized for the relatively high calorie count of its bubble tea.

The original shop was founded in 1996 in downtown Toronto. The chain consists of approximately 15 stores.

References

Drink companies of Canada
Bubble tea brands